Elisabeth Zerobin is an Austrian para-alpine skier. She represented Austria at the 1984 Winter Paralympics and won two bronze medals.

She won the bronze medal at the Women's Alpine Combination LW4 event and also at the Women's Slalom LW4 event.

She also competed at the Women's Downhill LW4 and Women's Giant Slalom LW4 events.

See also 
 List of Paralympic medalists in alpine skiing

References

External links 
 

Living people
Year of birth missing (living people)
Place of birth missing (living people)
Paralympic alpine skiers of Austria
Austrian female alpine skiers
Austrian amputees
Alpine skiers at the 1984 Winter Paralympics
Medalists at the 1984 Winter Paralympics
Paralympic bronze medalists for Austria
Paralympic medalists in alpine skiing
20th-century Austrian women
21st-century Austrian women